Daniel Abubakar Yisa, the Diocesan Bishop of Minna, is the Archbishop of the  Anglican Province of Lokoja, one of 14 within the Church of Nigeria.

Yisa was elected Bishop of Damaturu in 1996.

Notes

Living people
Anglican bishops of Minna
21st-century Anglican bishops in Nigeria
Anglican archbishops of Lokoja
21st-century Anglican archbishops
Year of birth missing (living people)
Anglican bishops of Damaturu